Tomáš Dvořák, known professionally as Floex, is a contemporary Czech composer, clarinetist, producer, DJ, and multimedia artist. He is best known for his work with indie game studio Amanita Design.

Dvořák released his debut album Pocustone in 2001 under the moniker Floex, which is a combination of the words "float" and "experiment". His work came to wider recognition, however, after composing the soundtrack for Amanita Design's award-winning adventure game Machinarium, as well as the Samorost series.

Biography
Dvořák started playing clarinet at a young age and went on to study at the Academy of Performing Arts in Prague and in the studio of Michael Bielický. He first recorded electronic music in 1996 and released Pocustone in 2001 to critical acclaim. 
During the early 2000s, he created several live multimedia art installations including RGB.

He also began his collaboration with Amanita Design, starting with Samorost 2  in 2006. Their next game, Machinarium (2008) was met with wide acclaim and his score won PC Gamer's Best Soundtrack award for that year. He next released the EP Gone in 2013, featuring a collaboration with Hidden Orchestra.

His second full-length album, Zorya, was released in 2011. It received two Anděl awards and was nominated for several others. His third collaboration with Amanita Design, the ambitious Samorost 3, was also released in 2016. His latest album, A Portrait of John Doe (2018), a collaboration with Tom Hodge and the Prague Radio Symphony Orchestra, fuses modern classical music with avant-garde electronica.

Awards and nominations
Pocustone
Anděl award (2001)
European Quartz Award (nominated) (2001)
Machinarium soundtrack
PC Gamer - Best Soundtrack (2009)
Zorya
Vinyla award (nominated) (2011)
Apollo award (nominated) (2011)
Anděl awards - Best Electronic Album and Best Alternative Album (2011)

Discography

As Floex
Pocustone (2001)
Zorya (2011)
Gone EP (2013)
A Portrait of John Doe (with Tom Hodge) (2018)
Je suis Karl soundtrack (with Tom Hodge) (2021)

With Amanita Design
Samorost 2 soundtrack (2006)
Machinarium soundtrack (2009)
Machinarium Bonus EP (2009)
Samorost 3 Pre-Remixes EP (2015)
Samorost 3 soundtrack (2016)
Machinarium Remixed (2019)
Pilgrims soundtrack (2019)
Samorost Remaster (2021)
Phonopolis Soundtrack (TBA)

Other works

Interactive media
RGB (2002-2008)
Archifon (with Initi) (2011–present)
Netykavka (with Initi) (2016–present)

Theatre
Don't Stop (2018)

References

1978 births
Living people
Czech composers
Czech male composers
Clarinetists
21st-century clarinetists
21st-century Czech male musicians